Salisediminibacterium haloalkalitolerans is a Gram-positive, rod-shaped and non-motile bacterium from the genus of Salisediminibacterium which has been isolated from the Lonar crater lake in India.

References

 

Bacillaceae
Bacteria described in 2015